The Research Designs & Standards Organisation (RDSO) is an ISO 9001 research and development organisation under the Ministry of Railways of the Government of India, which functions as a technical adviser and consultant to the Railway Board, the Zonal Railways, the Railway Production Units, RITES, RailTel and Ircon International in respect of design and standardization of railway equipment and problems related to railway construction, operations and maintenance.

History
To enforce standardization and co-ordination between various railway systems in British India, the Indian Railway Conference Association (IRCA) was set up in 1902. It was followed by the establishment of the Central Standards Office (CSO) in 1930, for preparation of designs, standards and specifications. However, till India's independence in 1947, most of the designs and manufacture of railway equipment was entrusted to foreign consultants. After independence, a new organisation called Railway Testing and Research Centre (RTRC) was set up in 1952 at Lucknow, for undertaking the intensive investigation of railway problems, providing basic criteria and new concepts for design purposes, for testing prototypes and generally assisting in finding solutions for specific problems. In 1957, the Central Standards Office (CSO) and the Railway Testing and Research Centre (RTRC) were integrated into a single unit named Research Designs and Standards Organisation (RDSO) under the Ministry of Railways with its headquarters at Manak Nagar, Lucknow. The status of RDSO was changed from an "Attached Office" to a "Zonal Railway" on 1 January 2003, to give it greater flexibility and a boost to the research and development activities.

Organisation
RDSO is headed by the Director-General who ranks equivalent to the general manager of a Zonal Railway. The present Director General is Sanjeev Bhutani  The Director-General is assisted by an Additional Director General and 23 Sr. Executive Directors and Executive Directors, who are in charge of the 27 directorates: Bridges and Structures, the Centre for Advanced Maintenance Technology (CAMTECH), Carriage, Geotechnical Engineering, Testing, Track Design, Medical, EMU & Power Supply, Engine Development, Finance & Accounts, Telecommunication, Quality Assurance, Personnel, Works, Psycho-Technical, Research, Signal, Wagon Design, Electric Locomotive, Stores, Track Machines & Monitoring, Traction Installation, Energy Management, Traffic, Metallurgical & Chemical, Motive Power and Library & Publications. All the directorates except Defence Research are located in Lucknow.

Projects
Design and specification of Vande Bharat Express

Development of design & specification of WAG-12

Development of a new crashworthy design of 4500 HP WDG4 locomotive incorporating new technology to improve dynamic braking and attain significant fuel savings.

Development of Drivers’ Vigilance Telemetric Control System which directly measures and analyses variations in biometric parameters to determine the state of alertness of the driver.

Development of Kavach.

Development of Computer Aided Drivers Aptitude test equipment for screening high-speed train drivers for Rajdhani/Shatabdi Express trains to evaluate their reaction time, form perception, vigilance and speed anticipation.

Assessment of residual fatigue life of critical railway components like rail, rail weld, wheels, cylinder head, OHE mast, catenary wire, contact wire, wagon components, low components, etc. to formulate remedial actions.

Modification of specification of Electric Lifting Barrier to improve its strength and reliability

Design and development of modern fault tolerant, fail-safe, maintainer friendly Electronic Interlocking system

Development of 4500 HP Hotel Load Locomotive to provide clean and noise-free power supply to coaches from the locomotive to eliminate the existing generator car of Garib Rath express trains.

Field trials conducted for electric locomotive hauling Rajdhani/Shatabdi express trains with Head On Generation (HOG) system to provide clean and noise-free power supply to end on coaches.

Development of WiMAX technology to provide internet access to the passengers in running trains.

Design and Development of Ballastless Track with the indigenous fastening system (BLT-IFS).

Design and Development of Rail Free Fastening (RFF) for Girder Bridges.

Reduction in de-stressing temperature in LWR with the use of wider and heavier sleepers.

Carrying Long Welded Rails through Points and Crossings.

Laying of Long Welded Rails in Sharp curve of less than 440 m radius.

Design and development of 25T Axle load bogie for different wagons.

Major achievements

 Design and Development of high toe load fastening system, ERC mark-V
 Development of Pre-stressed concrete sleeper and allied components along with Source development.
 Development of newly designed Double Decker Coaches in Indian Railways.
 Development of improved AT welding technology with the Single Shot crucible, auto-thimble and 3-piece mould.
 Design and development of first Emission Test Car (ETC) to test diesel locomotive emissions
 Design and Development of Wider and Heavier sleeper fit for 25 tonne axle load
 Development of protocol for laying long welded rails through points and crossing using welded CMS frogs.
 Development of Head on Generation(HOG), that taps overhead supply lines and distributes power to the train coaches, an alternative to End on Generation(EOG).

References

External links
 RDSO website
 RDSO Provider

Government-owned companies of India
Railway companies of India
1903 establishments in the British Empire
Organizations established in 1903
Research institutes in India
Transport research organizations
Engineering research institutes